Heterachthes fraterculus is a species of beetle in the family Cerambycidae. It was described by Martins and Napp in 1986.

References

Heterachthes
Beetles described in 1986